The 1942 Swedish Ice Hockey Championship was the 20th season of the Swedish Ice Hockey Championship, the national championship of Sweden. Hammarby IF won the championship.

Tournament

First Qualification round 
 IF Fellows - Uddens IF 1:0
 IK Huge - Sandvikens IF 1:7

Second Qualification round 
 Sörhaga IK - IF Fellows 2:1
 Brynäs IF - Sandvikens IF 4:3

First round
 Skuru IK - Karlbergs BK 0:1
 Nacka SK - Horntulls IF 3:1
 AIK - Rålambshofs IF 9:0
 IK Hermes - Djurgårdens IF 3:1
 IF Göta Karlstad - Sörhaga IK 4:0
 Brynäs IF - Mora IK 8:3
 GIF Sundsvall - IFK Nyland 1:9
 IK Sirius - IF Vesta 1:5
 VIK Västerås HK - IF Aros 2:3
 IFK Norrköping - IK Sleipner 3:0
 Matteuspojkarna - IK Sture 11:0

1/8 Finals
 IFK Mariefred - AIK 2:6
 Brynäs IF - IFK Nyland 2:10
 Hammarby IF - IK Hermes 5:0
 IF Vesta - Nacka SK 3:3/3:4
 IF Göta Karlstad - Karlbergs BK 0:6
 IFK Norrköping - IK Göta 3:13
 IF Aros - Reymersholms IK 1:4
 Södertälje SK - UoIF Matteuspojkarna 5:2

Quarterfinals 
 AIK - IFK Nyland 2:1
 Hammarby IF - Nacka SK 4:1
 Karlbergs BK - IK Göta 4:2
 Reymersholms IK - Södertälje SK 0:2

Semifinals 
 AIK - Hammarby IF 0:4
 Karlbergs BK - Södertälje SK 0:2

Final 
 Hammarby IF - Södertälje SK 3:0

External links
 Season on hockeyarchives.info

Cham
Swedish Ice Hockey Championship seasons